Sing a Song of Basie is a 1958 album by Lambert, Hendricks & Ross.

Track listing
 "Every Day I Have the Blues" (Memphis Slim) – 5:18
 "It's Sand, Man!" (Hendricks, Lambert, Ed Lewis) – 2:27
 "Two for the Blues" (Neal Hefti, Hendricks) – 2:42
 "One O'Clock Jump" (Count Basie, Eddie Durham) – 3:00
 "Little Pony" (Hefti, Hendricks) – 2:28
 "Down for Double" (Freddie Green, Hendricks, Lambert) – 2:11
 "Fiesta in Blue" (Benny Goodman, Hendricks, Lambert, Jimmy Mundy) – 3:14
 "Down for the Count" (Frank Foster, Melissa Ritter) – 2:58
 "Blues Backstage" (Foster) – 2:58
 "Avenue C" (Buck Clayton, Hendricks, Lambert) – 2:52

Personnel
 Lambert, Hendricks & Ross – vocals:
 Dave Lambert
 Jon Hendricks
 Annie Ross
 Nat Pierce – piano
 Freddie Green – guitar
 Eddie Jones – double bass
 Sonny Payne – drums

References 

1958 albums
Lambert, Hendricks & Ross albums
Albums produced by Creed Taylor
Verve Records albums
Impulse! Records albums